The white-chested babbler (Pellorneum rostratum) is found in Brunei, Indonesia, Malaysia, Myanmar, Singapore, and Thailand.
Its natural habitats are subtropical or tropical moist lowland forests and subtropical or tropical mangrove forests.
It is threatened by habitat loss.

References

Collar, N. J. & Robson, C. 2007. Family Timaliidae (Babblers)  pp. 70 – 291 in; del Hoyo, J., Elliott, A. & Christie, D.A. eds. Handbook of the Birds of the World, Vol. 12. Picathartes to Tits and Chickadees. Lynx Edicions, Barcelona.

white-chested babbler
Birds of Malesia
white-chested babbler
white-chested babbler
Taxonomy articles created by Polbot
Taxobox binomials not recognized by IUCN